Ringelsdorf-Niederabsdorf is a town in the district of Gänserndorf in the Austrian state of Lower Austria.

Geography
Ringelsdorf-Niederabsdorf lies in the eastern Weinviertel on the Zaya River, exactly at the meeting of the borders with Slovakia and the Czech Republic. About 15.68 percent of the municipality is forested.

References

External links 
 openstreetmap.org map of Ringelsdorf-Niederabsdorf

Cities and towns in Gänserndorf District